D35 may refer to:

Vehicles

Aircraft 
 Beechcraft D35, an American single-engine aircraft
 Dewoitine D.35, a French single-engine passenger aircraft

Automobiles 
 New Flyer D35, a high-floor transit bus

Rail transport 
 BHP Port Kembla D35 class, a class of diesel locomotives
 LNER Class D35, a class of British steam locomotives

Ships 
 , a Daring-class destroyer of the Royal Navy
 , a Type 45 destroyer of the Royal Navy
 , a V and W-class destroyer of the Royal Navy

Other uses 
 D35 motorway (Czech Republic)
 D35 road (Croatia)
 Queen's Gambit Declined, a chess opening